The Kampala wedding massacre was a mass murder that occurred at a wedding party in the Naguru neighbourhood of Kampala, Uganda on 26 June 1994. The perpetrator, Richard Komakech, shot and killed 26 people at the party before he was apprehended and subsequently killed in revenge.

Massacre 
Richard Komakech, a private in the Ugandan military police, was attending the wedding when he requested a female guest, Irene Ati, to dance with him. Ati declined the offer, but Komakech repeatedly insisted she dance with him to the point he became aggressive and had to be separated from her. Komakech began rioting and was expelled from the festivities. The drunken private then went to fetch a semi-automatic rifle and returned to the party about ten minutes later. Komakech first killed Irene Ati, and then started shooting randomly at the guests, in which 14 people died on the spot (including Irene Ati) and 12 more later died in hospital, while 13 others were seriously wounded.

Komakech eventually attempted to commit suicide with his rifle by shooting himself in the mouth, though he suffered only wounds to his forehead and pretended to be dead until police arrived. Although officers who apprehended Komakech tried to prevent the guests from killing him, Irene Ati's father managed to break through the police cordon and killed Komakech by smashing in his skull.

By the end of the massacre 27 people had been killed.

See also
Bombo shooting
Kamwenge Trading Centre shooting
List of massacres in Uganda

References

Attacks on weddings
Murder–suicides in Africa
Mass murder in 1994
Massacres in 1994
Massacres in Uganda
1994 crimes in Uganda
History of Kampala
Spree shootings in Uganda
20th century in Kampala
June 1994 events in Africa
1990s murders in Uganda